The 2013 Triple J Hottest 100 was announced on Australia Day 26 January 2014. It is the 21st countdown of the most popular songs of the year, as chosen by the listeners to Australian radio station Triple J. The countdown received 1.49 million votes.

Voting commenced on 20 December 2013, and closed on 20 January 2014.

Full list

The #101 entry belonged to "What Doesn't Kill You" by Jake Bugg.

Artists with multiple entries

Four tracks
Daft Punk (3, 17, 49, 58)
Ezra Koenig (Three times with Vampire Weekend and once with Major Lazer) (26, 31, 74, 90)

Three tracks
Lorde (2, 12, 15)
Arctic Monkeys (4, 6, 18)
London Grammar (10, 35, 61)
Haim (11, 27, 56)
Kanye West (Two times solo and once with Busta Rhymes) (20, 59, 73)
RÜFÜS (21, 34, 91)
Disclosure (Twice original and one remixed by Flume) (23, 63, 69) 
Vampire Weekend (26, 31, 90)
Chvrches (28, 37, 60)
Queens of the Stone Age (46, 72, 97)

Two tracks
Vance Joy (1, 95)
Flume (Once with Chet Faker and one remix) (5, 63)
Chet Faker (Once with Flume and once solo) (5, 65)
Arcade Fire (16, 54)
Ian Kenny (Once with Birds of Tokyo and once with Karnivool) (22, 100) 
Rudimental (24, 47)
Ahren Stringer (Once with The Amity Affliction and once with Illy) (40, 77)
Boy & Bear (41, 55)
Cloud Control (52, 82)
Andy Bull (57, 81)
Illy (66, 77)
Bliss n Eso (67, 94)
Bring Me the Horizon (86, 92)

Countries represented
Australia – 45
United States – 29
United Kingdom – 23
France – 4
New Zealand – 3
Canada – 3
Ireland – 1 
Norway – 1
South Africa – 1

Notes
This is the fifth consecutive countdown that Illy has appeared in, having first had a song feature in the Hottest 100 of 2009.
Vance Joy joins Denis Leary (1993), Alex Lloyd (2001) and Bernard Fanning (2005) as the only outright solo countdown winners.
This is the only time in Hottest 100 history when the total number of votes tallied was less than the previous year, tallying in at 1.49 million votes (2012 tallied over 1.5 million).
Illy's Ausmusic Month Medley featured four songs that made it into previous Hottest 100 lists: "Tomorrow" by Silverchair (#5 in 1994), "The Nosebleed Section" by Hilltop Hoods (#9 in 2003), "My Happiness" by Powderfinger (#1 in 2000) and "On Top" by Flume (#67 in 2012). The song also featured numerous references from various other songs.

CD release

The Triple J Hottest 100 CD for 2013 is the twenty first edition of the series. The double-CD was released on 28 February 2014.

Top 10 Albums of 2013
A smaller poll of Triple J listeners' favorite albums of the year was held in December 2013.

References

2013 in Australian music
Australia Triple J
2013